In Greek mythology, Aegyrus (Ancient Greek: Αἴγυρος) or Aegydrus was the sixth king of Sicyon who reigned for 34 years.

Family 
Aegyrus was the son and heir of King Thelxion, descendant of the city's founder Aegialeus (an autochthon). Aegyrus was succeeded in the throne by his son Thurimachus.

Notes

References 

 Pausanias, Description of Greece with an English Translation by W.H.S. Jones, Litt.D., and H.A. Ormerod, M.A., in 4 Volumes. Cambridge, MA, Harvard University Press; London, William Heinemann Ltd. 1918. . Online version at the Perseus Digital Library
 Pausanias, Graeciae Descriptio. 3 vols. Leipzig, Teubner. 1903. Greek text available at the Perseus Digital Library.

Princes in Greek mythology
Mythological kings of Sicyon
Kings in Greek mythology
Sicyonian characters in Greek mythology